Angelko Panov (Macedonian: Aнгeлкo Пaнoв ; born 21 January 1979 in Skopje), also known as Angel Panov, is a retired Macedonian international football player.

Club career
After having played in several best teams in his country, and also HNK Hajduk Split in the Croatian First Leaguye, in 2002, he moved to Serbia to play in the capital's club OFK Belgrade.

International career
He made his senior debut for Macedonia in a November 2001 friendly match against Hungary and has earned a total of 2 caps, scoring no goals. His second and final international was an August 2008 friendly against Malta.

Honours
Vardar Skopje
1 time Macedonian Prva Liga Champion: 2001–02

References

External sources
 
 
 Profile at Srbijafudbal. 

1979 births
Living people
Footballers from Skopje
Association football forwards
Macedonian footballers
North Macedonia under-21 international footballers
North Macedonia international footballers
FK Rabotnički players
FK Pobeda players
HNK Hajduk Split players
FK Vardar players
FK Makedonija Gjorče Petrov players
OFK Beograd players
Macedonian First Football League players
Croatian Football League players
First League of Serbia and Montenegro players
Macedonian expatriate footballers
Expatriate footballers in Croatia
Macedonian expatriate sportspeople in Croatia
Expatriate footballers in Serbia and Montenegro
Macedonian expatriate sportspeople in Serbia and Montenegro